The Hot in the Shade Tour was a concert tour by American rock band Kiss in support of their fifteenth studio album Hot in the Shade.

Background
Following the Crazy Nights World Tour, Stanley had embarked on a solo club tour in 1989 while the band had gone on hiatus. The tour was set to begin earlier in the year, but was postponed to allow the second single from the album, "Forever", to be promoted as the first single, "Hide Your Heart" did not make as much an impact. Prior to the beginning of the tour, the band spent two weeks in Lubbock, Texas to rehearse for the tour before setting out. Kiss was the supporting act for Whitesnake in Toronto on June 15, 1990, playing alongside opening acts Slaughter and Faster Pussycat.

On July 4, 1990, Stanley while on his way home after a performance in Springfield, ended up in a car accident and suffered minor neck and back injuries, which had forced the cancellation of the New Haven show on July 5, 1990 which was later rescheduled to October 27. He would later get injured again when he broke his ribs during a show in Johnstown which had resulted in a few shows getting canceled. This was the last tour to feature drummer Eric Carr, who later died of cancer on November 24, 1991. Carr performed his final show with Kiss on November 9, 1990 in New York City.

In the tour program for the band's final tour, Simmons reflected on the tour:

Stage setup
The band used a 40-foot sunglasses-wearing sphynx from the album cover on their stage, naming it "Leon", which featured the ability to emit fireworks and lights from out of its mouth. At the beginning of every show, the mouth of the sphynx would open up to reveal the band in silhouette among the laser beams. When the band was performing "God of Thunder", the keyboardist Gary Corbett would sing the final verse through a synthesizer, to put it in sync with the mouth of the sphynx prop to make it look like it was singing. At the end of every performance, the sphynx would 'disappear', and through the use of cannon shots and sparks on stage and above the audience, the lighted band logo would roll up from the bottom of the stage during "Detroit Rock City".

The stage was also included a ramp, which was draped in fog and fluid spewing tubing, as well as railed platforms on each side of the stage for Stanley and Kulick to throw guitar picks to the audience.

Reception
Lonna Baldwin, a reporter from the Spokesman-Review who had attended the performance in Spokane on September 8, 1990, opened her review with the acknowledgement of the number of heavy metal fans that had turned out for the concert that night. She praised the usage of the band's entrance from the sphinx prop at the back of the stage, noting on the roar from the audience. She noted on the mixture of both new and old songs that the band performed during the show, also stating that the members knew how to put on a show. She concluded her review, stating that each song was enthusiastically received by the audience as well as the "standing throng in front of the stage".

Kim Reeves from the Southeast Missourian who attended the Cape Girardeau performance in May 22, 1990, had given the performance a positive review. She opened her review, noting on the lasting impressions of the sphynx on the stage and the pyrotechnical effects, noting on the roar of the crowd of 5,200 in attendance when the band had entered the stage. She stated that the band had evolved into a more mature group with the passage of time, citing the excitement from the crowd and the amount of energy from the band members from Stanley getting the audience to participate and Simmons jumping around on stage – also talking about the absence of the makeup, and the appearances of the band wearing spandex, and athletic style shoes.

Peter Atkinson, a staff writer from the Record-Journal,  also gave a positive review following the band's New Haven performance. He noted on the usage of both the colossal stage set and both classic and new songs the band had performed during the show. Acknowledging the crowd's reactions to the show, he stated that the audience were well-behaved and surprisingly 'orderly' despite the band's energy on stage, adding when the encore had started - the security guards would scurry to safety behind the stage front barriers. He concluded his review, citing that the show was "a grand performance by the elder statesmen of metal".

Setlist
This is an example setlist performed from a show, but may not represent the majority of shows during the tour.
 "I Stole Your Love"
 "Deuce"
 "Heaven's on Fire"
 "Crazy Crazy Nights"
 "Black Diamond"
 "Shout It Out Loud"
 "Strutter"
 "Calling Dr. Love"
 "I Was Made for Lovin' You"
 "Rise to It"
 "Fits Like a Glove"
 "Hide Your Heart"
 "Lick It Up"
 "God of Thunder"
 "Forever"
 "Cold Gin"
 "Tears Are Falling"
 "I Love It Loud"
 "Love Gun"
 "Detroit Rock City"
Encore
 "I Want You"
 "Rock and Roll All Nite"

"Betrayed" was played twice on the tour, "Little Caesar" was played once on the tour and "Under the Gun" was played early on the tour, then was replaced by "I Was Made for Lovin' You".
"C'mon and Love Me" and "Hell or High Water" were played at the beginning of the tour.

Tour dates

 Kiss was the supporting act for Whitesnake at this show.
 During this show, the enormous stage set overloaded the arena's power supply, causing a transformer to explode outside the building, cutting electricity inside the arena and abruptly ending the show.
 At this show, Stanley ran into the guardrail on stage and cracked his ribs, causing some shows to be canceled.
 Eric Carr's last show.

Cancelled dates

Personnel 
 Paul Stanley – vocals, rhythm guitar
 Gene Simmons – vocals, bass
 Eric Carr – drums, backing vocals
 Bruce Kulick – lead guitar, backing vocals
Additional musician
 Gary Corbett – keyboards

References

Sources

1990 concert tours
Kiss (band) concert tours